Clear Creek Township is one of fourteen townships in Cooper County, Missouri, USA.  As of the 2000 census, its population was 439.

Clear Creek Township was named after the creek of the same name within its borders.

Geography
According to the United States Census Bureau, Clear Creek Township covers an area of 50.44 square miles (130.64 square kilometers); of this, 50.32 square miles (130.34 square kilometers, 99.77 percent) is land and 0.12 square miles (0.3 square kilometers, 0.23 percent) is water.

Unincorporated towns
 Harriston at 
 Hoffman at 
 Pleasant Green at 
(This list is based on USGS data and may include former settlements.)

Extinct towns
 Corioli at 
(These towns are listed as "historical" by the USGS.)

Adjacent townships
 Blackwater Township (north)
 Pilot Grove Township (northeast)
 Palestine Township (east)
 Lebanon Township (southeast)
 Otterville Township (south)
 Bowling Green Township, Pettis County (southwest)
 Heath Creek Township, Pettis County (west)

Cemeteries
The township contains these two cemeteries: Lamine and Sowers.

Major highways
  Interstate 70
  U.S. Route 40
  Route 135

Lakes
 Goose Lake

School districts
 Otterville R-Vi
 Pilot Grove C-4
 Smithton R-Vi

Political districts
 Missouri's 6th congressional district
 State House District 117
 State Senate District 21

Notable people
Clark Griffith, baseball pitcher, manager, and team owner.

References
 United States Census Bureau 2008 TIGER/Line Shapefiles
 United States Board on Geographic Names (GNIS)
 United States National Atlas

External links
 US-Counties.com
 City-Data.com

Townships in Cooper County, Missouri
Townships in Missouri